White people in Botswana are Botswanan people whose ancestry lies within the continent of Europe, most notably the United Kingdom and the Netherlands.

Currently, White Africans are a minority ethnic group in Botswana, accounting for around 3% of the country's population. The White population usually speak Afrikaans, with a small Serbian community in the country’s capital. The Afrikaner population is centred around farming communities in the Ghanzi Region (descendants of the Dorsland Trekkers). After the Zimbabwean Land Reforms, a small amount of Anglo-Zimbabwean Farmers moved to Botswana (as well as South Africa and Zambia) to start new lives.

History
European people began to immigrate into what is today the nation of Botswana in the 19th century, starting with the Boer people. The Dorsland Trek in the late 19th and early 20th centuries saw thousands of Boer families migrate from South Africa to present-day Namibia by way of Botswana. Many families stayed, especially in Ghanzi, which is in the Kalahari Desert. White Botswana people are primarily of Boer/Afrikaner descent, but smaller numbers are also of British/Rhodesian ancestry as well.

Additionally, there is a fairly significant Serbian community in the country, mainly families of immigrants from Yugoslavia who came beginning in the 1950s. There is a Serbian Society in Gaborone, which regularly hosts a variety of cultural events. In 2016 construction began on the first Serbian Orthodox church in Botswana, the St. Nicholas Church. The St. Sava Serbian Orthodox Church also operates in Gaborone.

Notable people

Roy Blackbeard, MP, High Commissioner from Botswana to the United Kingdom
Ross Branch, motorcycle racer
Christian de Graaff, MP, Minister of Agriculture
James G. Haskins, MP, Speaker of the National Assembly of Botswana
Derek Jones, Mayor of Gaborone
Ruth Williams Khama, First Lady of Botswana
Alfred Merriweather, MP, Speaker of the National Assembly of Botswana
Samantha Paxinos, Olympic swimmer for Botswana
James Freeman, Olympic swimmer for Botswana
Benjamin Steinberg, MP, first Treasurer of the Botswana Democratic Party
Hendrik van Zyl, famed trader and politician in Ghanzi

See also

White South Africans
White Namibians
Afrikaners
White people in Zambia
White people in Zimbabwe
White people
History of the Jews in Botswana
Serbs in Botswana

References and footnotes 

Serbian Society of Botswana

Botswana
 
Ethnic groups in Botswana
White culture in Africa